Garudinia macrolatana is a moth of the family Erebidae first described by Jeremy Daniel Holloway in 2001. It is found on Borneo. The habitat consists of lowland forests.

The wingspan is 7 mm for males and 7–8 mm for females.

References

Cisthenina
Moths described in 2001